Excessive Force II: Force on Force is a 1995 direct-to-video action film, starring Stacie Randall and Dan Gauthier. It was written by Mark Sevi and directed by Jonathan Winfrey. The film is a sequel to Excessive Force (1993), despite not bearing any relation to the original movie or its storyline.

Plot
Harly Cordell is an agent looking for revenge against her ex-boyfriend, now a criminal, who tried to kill her by shooting her in the head.

Cast
 Stacie Randall as Agent Harly Cordell
 Dan Gauthier as Francis Lydell
 Bradford Tatum as Yates
 David Hugghins as Martinez
 Michael Wiseman as Bobby Tucci 
 Henry Brown as Captain John Buchanan 
 John Sanderford as Agent Tom Harris 
 Jay Patterson as Detective Wayne O'Conner  
 Cyril O'Reilly as Deacon
 Anthony T. Pennello  as Ingram
 Anthony Paul as Mario
 Steven Kravitz as Paulie
 James Lew as Lee
 Ray Colbert as Agent Denon
 Mandingo Warrior as Ernie
 Rick Tyler Barnes as Jimeson
 Joe Maruzzo as Bartholomew "Barty D" D'Amato
 John Mese as Dr. David Prender
 Lisa Melilli as Miss McCarthy
 Dan Lauria as Orlando Franco
 Tom Wright as Grant Thompson 
 Terri J. Vaughn as Grace

Reception
TV Guide gave the film two out of four stars and stated: "The original Excessive Force was a ridiculous vehicle for low-level action star Thomas Ian Griffith; that film's only virtue was its colorful supporting cast. This film (originally written as a stand-alone project) is easier to take seriously, but lacks much in the way of colorful details to distract from its generic plot. The cast, writer Mark Sevi and director Jonathan Winfrey (a veteran of the Roger Corman stable) do what is expected of them, but their work lacks the spark that would set this movie apart from the countless other action mini-epics crowding the video shelves." "Monster Hunter" wrote: "It’s as forgettable as its star (Randall has numerous credits, but has anyone ever been in so many sequels with the number "4" in the title?) and you'll find yourself sympathizing with the wooziness Harly's head trauma causes her as you struggle through this one. It can't even muster up the perverse entertainment of the laughably bad Thomas Ian Griffith unrelated predecessor, Excessive Force." Scott Weinberg from DVD Talk gave it two out of five stars, stating: "Notable for being the only movie in the history of cinema to use the word "force" three times in its title, Excessive Force II: Force on Force is your ultra-standard lady-cop ass-kick cable flick chestnut. It offers not one whiff of an iota of originality or real craftsmanship, but for what it is, EC2 delivers the goods with only a minimum of unintentional hilarity." Mitch Lovell from "The Video Vacuum" gave it two and a half stars and said: "Overall, I think Excessive Force II: Force on Force is about on par with its predecessor. It doesn't have that film's great supporting cast, but I think it's a better made film than the original. It's not great, but as far as Part 2's go, you can do a lot worse. And as far as movies with the word "Force" in the title go, this is about as good as it gets."

References

External links
 
 

1995 direct-to-video films
1995 films
American films about revenge
American action films
American sequel films
CineTel Films films
Direct-to-video action films
Direct-to-video sequel films
Girls with guns films
New Line Cinema direct-to-video films
Films scored by Kevin Kiner
Films directed by Jonathan Winfrey
1990s English-language films
1990s American films